Tatjana Schneider is an architect and academic. She is currently head of the Institute for History and Theory of Architecture and the City (GTAS) at the Technical University Braunschweig in Germany. Before this, she was a Senior Lecturer in the School of Architecture, University of Sheffield, England and, in 2014/15, Professor for History and Theory of the City at HafenCity University Hamburg, Germany. She has a Ph.D. from the University of Strathclyde (2006), her thesis title being "Mechanisms of the themed environment".

The British Council's "Creative Economy" website states that:

Schneider was a founder member of the architectural co-operative Glasgow Letters on Architecture and Space (GLAS, 2000-2007), and also the Sheffield-based AGENCY – Transformative Research into Architectural Practice and Education in 2007 and the Radical Architectures Network in 2013.

Selected publications

Florian Kossak, Doina Petrescu, Tatjana Schneider, Renata Tyszczuk, Stephen Walker (editors) (2009). Agency: Working With Uncertain Architectures. Routledge.

References

Year of birth missing (living people)
Living people
Academics of the University of Sheffield
Alumni of the University of Strathclyde
British women architects